Janine M. Kern (born February 14, 1961) is an American attorney and jurist serving as an associate justice of the South Dakota Supreme Court.

Education 
She graduated from Arizona State University with a Bachelor of Science in 1982, and graduated from the University of Minnesota Law School in 1985.

Career 
She served in the Attorney General of South Dakota's office from 1985 to 1996, and became a circuit court judge in the Seventh Judicial Circuit in 1996. She was appointed to the Supreme Court on November 25, 2014, by Governor Dennis Daugaard, and took office on January 5, 2015. She was sworn in by her father, retired South Dakota circuit court judge Paul James Kern.

References

External links
 

1961 births
Living people
Arizona State University alumni
Justices of the South Dakota Supreme Court
University of Minnesota Law School alumni
Place of birth missing (living people)
21st-century American judges
21st-century American women judges